Numbers Cabaret, or simply Numbers, is a bar located in the Davie Village neighbourhood of Vancouver, British Columbia, Canada.

Reception
In 2014, Out Traveler Jase Peeples wrote, "A Vancouver landmark, Numbers is the oldest gay bar in the city, having opened its doors more than three decades ago. The multilevel space remains one of the most popular gay nightlife spots in Davie Village, with karaoke available seven days a week in the special 'FunBox' room. A full dance floor, pool tables, and multiple video screens located throughout the bar ensure that this location has something to offer everyone." Numbers was included in Queerty's list of "7 Great Canadian Gay Watering Holes to Add to Your Bucket List".

References

External links

 

LGBT culture in Vancouver
LGBT nightclubs in Canada
Nightclubs in Vancouver
West End, Vancouver